Donald John Rollo (March 11, 1887 – April 13, 1948) was a Canadian curler. He was the third of the 1929 Brier Champion team (skipped by Gordon Hudson), representing Manitoba.

References

Brier champions
1887 births
1948 deaths
Curlers from Manitoba
British emigrants to Canada
Sportspeople from London
Canadian male curlers